Arto Lintunen (born 2 November 1956) is a Finnish former professional darts player who competed members in the 1980s.

Career
He participated in the 1985 BDO World Darts Championship, but lost to Bob Anderson in the opening round. He returned to Lakeside the following year in 1986, but again lost in the first round, this time to Dave Whitcombe.

World Championship results

BDO
1985: First Round (lost to Bob Anderson 1-2) (sets) 
1986: First Round (lost to Dave Whitcombe 1-3)

References

External links
Profile and stats on Darts Database

Finnish darts players
Living people
British Darts Organisation players
1956 births
Sportspeople from Espoo